Belarusfilm is the main film studio of Belarus.

History

Belarusfilm, under the name Belgoskino was founded in 1924. In 1928, the Soviet Belarus studio (Савецкая Беларусь) was founded in Leningrad. The studio was moved to Minsk in 1939. Film production was interrupted by World War II, and restarted in 1946, when the studio assumed its current name.

In Soviet times, the studio was dubbed Partizanfilm, due to the large output of films portraying the Soviet partisan's struggle against Nazi occupation. The studio was, however, also renowned for its children's films.

The studio has to date made 131 animated films. Its first project was a coproduction with Soyuzmultfilm in 1963; a stop motion feature film called Attention! The Magician is in the City!  Consistent animated film production, however, did not begin until 1972.

Most of the output has been in Russian rather than Belarusian.

Belarusfilm is also a co-organizer of the Listapad film festival held in Minsk, Belarus in November.

Among the early, Soviet-era directors who oversaw films for the studio are: Alexander Faintsimmer, Oleg Frelikh, Vladimir Gardin, Vladimir Korsh-Sablin, Grigori Roshal, Boris Shpis, Yuri Tarich and Mikhail Verner.

In 2019, a large part of the movie Squad was shot at Belarusfilm. It is the first Bollywood film to be shot in Belarus.

Selected films

USSR
 1926  Tale of the Woods or Forest Story
 1927 Prostitute
 1928 Kastus Kalinovsky
 1928 His Excellency
 1929  See You Tomorrow
 1930 Hatred
 1930 Sasha
 1933 The Return of Nathan Becker
 1933 The First Platoon
 1934 Lieutenant Kijie
 1936  Late for a Date
 1936 Seekers of Happiness
 1937 Beethoven Concerto
 1938 The Bear
 1938 Men of the Sea a.k.a. Baltic Sailors
 1953 The Skylarks are Singing
 1959 A Girl Searches for Her Father
 1972 Fakir Hour
 1975 The Adventures of Buratino
 1976 Secret to the Whole World
 1977 About Red Riding Hood
 1985 Come and See

Belarus
 1993 Az vozdam 
 1993 Me Ivan, You Abraham
 1997 From Hell to Hell
 1995 Lato milosci 
 1997 Zeezicht 
 2003 Anastasia Slutskaya
 2003 Babiy Yar
 2003 Chernobyl Heart
 2004 Dunechka 
 2004 On the Nameless Height
 2006 Franz + Polina
 2010 Fortress of War
 2010 Massacre
 2012 In the Fog
 2020 Kupala

See also
Mosfilm
Gorky Film Studio
Lenfilm
Dovzhenko Film Studios
Soyuzmultfilm
Cinema of the Soviet Union

References

External links
Official site
Museum of the History of Belarusian Film
Tourist site description of Museum of Belarusian Film (has photos)
British Film Institute
In Soviet Times, Belgoskino was not afraid to experiment

Film studios
Animation studios
Cinema of Belarus
Culture in Minsk
History of Minsk
1928 establishments in the Soviet Union
Film production companies of the Soviet Union
Soviet animation studios
Mass media companies established in 1926
Soviet-era Belarusian films
Belarusfilm films